One Summer's Day is a 1917 British silent drama film directed by Frank Goodenough Bayly and starring Fay Compton, Owen Nares and Sam Livesey.

Cast
 Fay Compton as Maisie  
 Owen Nares as Captain Dick Rudyard  
 Sam Livesey as Philip Marsden  
 Eva Westlake as Chiana  
 A.G. Poulton 
 Caleb Porter 
 Roy Royston 
 Gwendoline Jesson

References

Bibliography
 Goble, Alan. The Complete Index to Literary Sources in Film. Walter de Gruyter, 1999.

External links
 

1917 films
1917 drama films
British drama films
British silent feature films
British black-and-white films
1910s English-language films
1910s British films
Silent drama films